We Are the Others is a Canadian psychological thriller film, directed by Jean-François Asselin and released in 2017. The film stars Pascale Bussières as Myriam Lambert, an architect struggling to keep her personal life and business afloat after her partner Alexandre disappears, and Émile Proulx-Cloutier as Frédéric Venne, a junior architect with the firm who is offered the opportunity to salvage the big project threatened by Alexandre's disappearance.

Accolades
The film received four nominations at the 6th Canadian Screen Awards, including Best Actor for Proulx-Cloutier.

References

External links
 

2017 films
2017 thriller drama films
Canadian psychological thriller films
Quebec films
2017 psychological thriller films
2017 drama films
2010s French-language films
French-language Canadian films
2010s Canadian films